The  (RND) is the Hanover-based joint corporate newsroom of German .

Madsack has the majority in regional newspapers with a circulation of roughly a million copies  published in Northern and Eastern Germany (states of Niedersachsen, Schleswig-Holstein, Mecklenburg-Vorpommern, Sachsen, Thüringen, Hessen, and Sachsen-Anhalt). Including partner newspapers, RedaktionsNetzwerk Deutschland claims a coverage of roughly four million readers.

In a modernization effort, the central editor office was founded in 2013 with the chief editor of the Hannoversche Allgemeine Zeitung taking over the lead.

References

External links 
  

Journalism in Germany
Mass media companies of Germany
Communications and media organisations based in Germany